George Lyman Paine Jr. (November 16, 1901 – July 1, 1978), was an American architect and radical left activist. He is known for his work with the Correspondence Publishing Committee with his second wife Frances Drake Paine, and was closely associated with James Boggs and Grace Lee Boggs.

Early life and first marriage

Lyman Paine was born in New York City, New York in November 1901. His father, George Lyman Paine Sr., was an Episcopal priest and a Christian Socialist, the son of philanthropist Robert Treat Paine. After graduating from Harvard University in 1922, G. Lyman Jr. became an architect. He married Ruth Forbes of the distinguished Forbes family in March 1926.

In 1926–1932, while living in New York City, the Paines became known for their apartment socials; one frequent social attendee, Mary Bancroft, wrote in her autobiography about her friend Ruth Forbes Paine's husband: "Lyman, ... was interested in what he termed 'The Ultimate Reality', which I interpreted as my old friend, 'Truth'. Lyman and I had endless discussions about this ultimate reality while sipping highballs of bathtub gin and ginger ale." After having two sons, Michael Paine and Cameron Paine, the couple separated about 1932 and were divorced in 1934.

Lyman and Ruth's son Michael Paine married Ruth Hyde, a friend of Lee Harvey Oswald's wife Marina, who was living with her at the time of the JFK assassination.

Later life and second marriage

In the mid-1930s, while working for the New York City Housing Authority, Lyman became disillusioned with the utility of his work designing housing projects to produce social improvement, and he became active in Marxist politics. There he met Frances "Freddy" Drake (3/21/1912–5/3/1999), whom he married in 1939. Then in 1947, on the occasion of the 25th anniversary of the Harvard College Class of 1922, Lyman wrote in their publication, the 25th Annual Report of the Harvard Class of 1922:

Lyman and Freddy Paine were early members of the Johnson-Forest Tendency, a group within the Trotskyist Socialist Workers Party which included Grace Lee Boggs and her husband James Boggs. The Johnson-Forest group split from the main current of the Trotskyist left at the beginning of the 1950s, setting up the Correspondence Publishing Committee which produced the newspaper Correspondence. When Johnson-Forest founder C. L. R. James left the group in 1962, the Paines remained with the Committee and the Boggses.

George Lyman Paine Jr died on July 1, 1978 while living in the County of Los Angeles, California at the age of 76 years, and his 2nd Wife, Frances 'Freddy' Drake Paine, died on May 3, 1999 also while living in California. Both, however, are buried on Sutton Island, Maine where they had summered for many years.

Writings 
Towards understanding Russia. I. Report of the British Quaker mission to Moscow, 1951. II. Objective thinking on communism 1952
Sutton Island, Maine: its houses, people, animals, weather 1963
Conversations in Maine 1967, 2018

References

External links 
Finding aid for the Frances D. & G. Lyman Paine Collection at the Reuther Library of Wayne State University
Short biography at Historical Boy's Clothing
Warren Commission Exhibit 1830 (pdf)
Website of the Boggs Center
History of St. Mary's Episcopal Church, Dorchester, Mass., at Dorchester Atheneum
"The Cemetery on Sutton Island, Maine" at cranberryisles.com
"Design Award, 1939 World's fair" at The Museum of the City of New York

1901 births
1978 deaths
Architects from New York City
Members of the Socialist Workers Party (United States)
American Christian socialists
Christian communists
Harvard University alumni
20th-century American architects